The East Los Angeles Interchange is an interchange complex located in Boyle Heights, California, approximately 2.5 miles (4 km) east of Downtown Los Angeles. With its southern portion handling over 550,000 vehicles per day (2008 AADT), it is the busiest freeway interchange in the world. The northern portion, called the San Bernardino Split, is often considered a separate interchange. Four numbered routes converge at the interchange: Interstate 5 (I-5), I-10, U.S. Route 101 (US 101), and State Route 60 (SR 60), but the freeway segments shift alignments and directions.

The interchange was named the Eugene A. Obregon Memorial Interchange, to honor U.S. Marine Corps member and Medal of Honor recipient Eugene A. Obregon.

Description
At the time of its construction in the early 1960s, the East Los Angeles Interchange was considered a civil engineering marvel. Located along the east bank of the Los Angeles River in the Los Angeles district of Boyle Heights, east of Downtown Los Angeles, the interchange comprises six freeway segments; that is, there are six freeway paths of travel into the complex. The actual number of numbered highways intersecting at this interchange is four:
 
 
 
 

The interchange is so complex because the intersecting freeways shift alignments and directions:
 I-5 (originally US 101) enters the complex from the south as the Santa Ana Freeway, but exits to the north as the Golden State Freeway. The Santa Ana Freeway continues west as US 101 toward the Four Level Interchange (Bill Keene Memorial Interchange) in downtown Los Angeles.
 I-10 (originally US 70 "Ramona Freeway" [sic] / US 60) is not contiguous through the interchange. Heading west into the complex on the San Bernardino Freeway (I-10), the trunk road heads to US 101 at the San Bernardino Split. In order to follow the I-10 alignment, one must exit the trunk road and follow a connector that merges with the alignment of southbound I-5, then exit that trunk and follow another connector to the Santa Monica Freeway (I-10).
 Heading west into the complex on the Pomona Freeway (SR 60), the primary road (or trunk) heads into the Santa Monica Freeway (I-10).

There is not complete freedom of movement within the interchange. Traffic flowing into it on certain freeways cannot leave it on all of the others.

Further complication is caused by the varying designs of each intersecting freeway and their related transition roads. Some have four lanes and are relatively straight and wide, while others have one lane, are narrow, or have curves with tighter radii or cambers. Traffic congestion is thus exacerbated as vehicles moving at high speed on the wider transition roads try to merge with slower moving vehicles coming from the narrow transition roads.

History

Construction of the  began in 1961. The enormity of the structure and the complexity of its many routes called for a $17,000 blueprint model of the highway.

In popular culture
Although not commonly called such by residents and other reporters, the freeway intersection was often called "Malfunction Junction" by former KNX traffic reporter Bill Keene, because of its complicated interchange structure. The interchange has also been referred to as "The Beast" L.A. Interchange and the "East Delay" Interchange, names attributed to KNX's Jim Thornton, as well as the "Nickel/Dime" during traffic reports.

See also

References

External links

 Pictorial Guide to the Los Angeles Area Highways - East Los Angeles Interchange
 California @ AA Roads - US-101 North/East Los Angeles Interchange

Southern California freeways
Road interchanges in California
Boyle Heights, Los Angeles
Eastside Los Angeles
Interstate 5
Interstate 10
U.S. Route 101
Roads in Los Angeles County, California
Buildings and structures in Los Angeles County, California
Road interchanges in the United States